Chinni Jayanth (born Krishnamurthy Narayanan on 26 July 1960) is an Indian film director, producer, comedian, actor and mimicry artist who has appeared in many main, character and supporting roles in Tamil films. He is also a popular television personality having hosted hit shows like Sagalai Vs Ragalai, Kalakka Povathu Yaar and Asathapovathu Yaaru on Sun TV in Chennai. He is also a recipient of the Kalaimamani award given by the Government of Tamil Nadu for excellence in the field of cinema. He received this award from the Chief Minister of Tamil Nadu at a glittering function at Valluvar Kottam.

As an acknowledgement of his efforts in the field of cinema, mimicry, stage performances and social service activities, Chinni Jayanth was presented with a doctorate by The Open International University of Alternate Medicine on 29 December 2013.

Early life
Chinni Jayanth is an alumnus of Ramakrishna Mission Students Home, Chennai. He went on to study at New College, Royapettah. He then completed his acting course (Diploma in Film Technology, DFTech) from the Film and Television Institute of Tamil Nadu in Taramani.

Cinema career

Jayanth began his acting career in 1984, playing the supporting role to the eccentric villain in director Mahendran's film Kai Kodukkum Kai.

He carved a niche for himself with his unique style of comedy which included the creation of some unique words like gilfans, silfans, etc. which became a rage among the youth. His supporting roles in movies like Kizhakku Vasal, Idhayam, Kannedhirey Thondrinal and Chinna Pulla, are audience favourites.

Jayanth's performance in Chinna Pulla (1994) along with Revathi was well received. In the movie, Jayanth portrayed a mentally challenged person. This movie was also the first production of his company Ashtalakshmi Creators.

His directorial debut was in the film Unakkaga Mattum. The second film he directed was Kaanal Neer, which introduced J.K. Rithesh and Manisha Chatterjee in lead roles.

His last direction was the movie Neeye Yen Kaadhali (2010), and played a vital role in the screen play. The film was graded by experts Suresh Menon and Brian Jennings at HD Studios, Sushma Multimedia, Chennai.

Filmography

Actor
Pongalo Pongal
Rakshana (Telugu)
December 31 (Kannada)
Gokulam
Kizhakku Vaasal
Kadhalar Dhinam
Kai Kodukkum Kai
Chinna Pulla
Manathile Oru Paattu
January 1
Ullathai Killathe
24 Mani Neram
Santhosha Kanavukal
Idaya Kovil
Pondatti Sonna Kettukanum
Paattu Padava
Idhaya Deepam
Uyire Unakkaga
Unnudan
Aayiram Pookkal Malarattum
Valarpirai Kanavugal
Muthal Vasantham
Pillai Nila
Paaru Paaru Pattanam Paaru
Siragu Atika Asai
China China Paravaigal
Chinna Poove Mella Pesu
Kaalamellam Un Madiyil
Kattradhu Kalavu
Puthir
Idhayam
Endrum Anbudan
Ooty
Valayal Satham
Nangal Puthiyavargal
Idhaya Deepam
Annanagar Mudhal Theru
Nallavan
Manidhan Marivittan
Dharmam Vellum
Maanagara Kaaval
Ennarukil Nee Irunthal
Rasigan Oru Rasigai
Vidinja Kalyanam
Nadigan
Mallu Vetti Minor
Thambikku Oru Pattu
Karum Kuyil Kondrum
Anbu Sangili
Seevalaperi Pandi
Velicham
Idhaya Thamarai
Pudhiya Raagam
Kizhakku Vasal
Kathirukka Neramillai
Harichandra
Sandhitha Velai
Anand
Adhisaya Manithan
Meera
Eeramana Rojave
Vetri Vizha
My Dear Marthandan
Vetri Mel Vetri
Ayul Kaithi
Chinna Vathiyar
Athisaya Piravi
Raja Chinna Roja
Dilly Babu
Vaigasi Poranthachu
Enga Thambi
Aanazhagan
Krishna
Kannedhirey Thondrinal
Pooparika Varugirom
Kanave Kalaiyadhe
Maanbumigu Maanavan
Ratchagan

2000s

2010s

2020s

Director
Unakkaga Mattum (2000)
Kaanal Neer (2007)
Neeye En Kadhali (2010)

Dubbing artist
Aandavan (2000) - Rajinikanth

Web series

References

External links

BigFlix
SS Music
Fielding on a comic track – The Hindu
The ones who made a mark – The Hindu
Sushma Multimedia

Tamil male actors
Male actors from Tamil Nadu
Indian male film actors
Living people
Tamil comedians
1960 births
M.G.R. Government Film and Television Training Institute alumni
Television personalities from Tamil Nadu
20th-century Indian male actors
21st-century Indian male actors
Recipients of the Kalaimamani Award